A monument to Raoul Wallenberg stands at Great Cumberland Place in London's Marble Arch district, outside the Western Marble Arch Synagogue and near the Swedish Embassy. The 10 ft bronze monument was sculpted by Philip Jackson and is a larger-than-life representation of Wallenberg, standing against a bronze wall made up of 100,000 Schutz-Passes, the protective passes used by Wallenberg to rescue Hungarian Jews.

The monument was unveiled by Queen Elizabeth II in February 1997, in a ceremony attended by the President of Israel, Ezer Weizman, the Secretary General of the United Nations, Kofi Annan, and survivors of the Holocaust. Annan also gave a speech at the ceremony. The statue was unveiled during the second day of Weizman's state visit to the United Kingdom. The ceremony was also attended by Sigmund Sternberg, Chairman of the Executive Committee of the Wallenberg Appeal and Robert Davis, the Lord Mayor of Westminster.

The statue was described as a monument at the time of its unveiling rather than a memorial, as Wallenberg's family believed that there was no evidence for his death. Wallenberg would have been aged 84 in 1997.

A second British monument to Wallenberg stands near the Welsh National War Memorial in Alexandra Gardens, in Cardiff, Wales.

References

External links
 

1997 establishments in the United Kingdom
1997 sculptures
Bronze sculptures in the United Kingdom
Monuments and memorials in London
Statues of activists
Outdoor sculptures in London
Cultural depictions of Raoul Wallenberg
Sculptures by Philip Jackson
Wallenberg, Raoul
Wallenberg, Raoul